Walker's Creek Schoolhouse is a historic one-room school building located near Newport, Augusta County, Virginia. It was built about 1850, as a one-room, rectangular log, gable roofed schoolhouse measuring 22 feet by 26 feet.  It has a large stone chimney, and a later shed addition and front porch.  The school closed about 1935, and after 1948 was converted to a dwelling.

It was listed on the National Register of Historic Places in 1985.

References

One-room schoolhouses in Virginia
School buildings on the National Register of Historic Places in Virginia
School buildings completed in 1850
Schools in Augusta County, Virginia
National Register of Historic Places in Augusta County, Virginia
1850 establishments in Virginia